The Lake Zurich Marathon Swim belongs to the world's longest swimming marathon races. It is held annually in August and is organized by the Sri Chinmoy Marathon Team.

Winner's list 
Winner's list, overall non-wetsuit (Race record highlighted)

References

External links 
 Sri Chinmoy Races, Official Site 
 Video-Trailer: 2013
 Video: Interview 2011

Open water swimming competitions
Swimming competitions in Switzerland
Sports events founded by Sri Chinmoy
August sporting events
Recurring sporting events established in 1969
Summer events in Switzerland
1969 establishments in Switzerland